Warren Bartholomew Fitzgerald  (April 1868 – November 7, 1930), was a Major League Baseball pitcher. He played in the majors for the  Louisville Colonels  during the 1891 and 1892 seasons.

External links

1868 births
1930 deaths
Major League Baseball pitchers
Baseball players from Pennsylvania
19th-century baseball players
Louisville Colonels players
Seattle (minor league baseball) players
Leadville Blues players